The Nordfriedhof ("North Cemetery") is a public cemetery run by the city of Leipzig, located at Berliner Straße 125–127 in the district of Eutritzsch between Hamburger Straße, Theresienstraße and Maximilianallee, directly adjoining the smaller Old Jewish Burial Ground ("Alter Israelitischer Friedhof").

History
The Nordfriedhof was opened on 24 May 1881. In comparison to the largest burial ground in the city, the Südfriedhof, which covers 82 hectares, the Nordfriedhof has less than a tenth of the area, at 7.3 hectares. Nevertheless in terms of landscaping, ecology and tree-planting it is extremely varied, and has, for example, an area of wetland, set up after the year 2000.

The cemetery buildings date from the years 1905–1910. Otto Brückwald constructed a complex based on Italian models with leafy wooden arcades connecting the chapel, the mortuary and the administrative buildings. The chapel was destroyed during the air raids of 4 December 1943. To the left of the entrance is the former house of the keeper, also designed by Brückwald. He did not produce a park cemetery of the new type until 1886, when the Südfriedhof was opened. In the Nordfriedhof there were no ornamental areas, except for some colourful flowerbeds in front of main entrance on the Berliner Straße.

Two Citizens of Honour (Ehrenbürger) of the city of Leipzig are buried here, Senior Imperial Counsel  and the President of the Imperial Court . Further notable individuals buried here are Ernst Arthur Seemann, founder of the publishing house E. A. Seemann,

Also in the Nordfriedhof is one of the oldest monuments to the Battle of Leipzig (1813). After a mass grave of the fallen of the battle was discovered in 1892 in the Eutritzscher Straße, the Leipzig Historical Union commissioned a gravestone from the architect Franz Drechsler. The monument, opposite the former Theresienstraße entrance, was dedicated on 18 October 1899, and consists of an unworked block of stone with the inscription "Freund und Feind im Tod vereint" ("Friend and foe united in death") and a smaller rectangular stone block behind the memorial stone.

Literature 
 Der Friedhofswegweiser. Diesseits und jenseits. Stadt Leipzig (pp. 32–39). Leipzig: Mammut-Verlag 2005

Notes

External links 
 Stadt Leipzig, Amt für Stadtgrün und Gewässer: Stadt Leipzig: Amt für Stadtgrün und Gewässer official website Nordfriedhof 
 

Cemeteries in Leipzig
Tourist attractions in Leipzig
Protected areas of Saxony